Galac-Tac is a closed-end, science fiction, play-by-mail (PBM) wargame. It was first published by Phoenix Publications in 1982. By 1990, the publisher had changed its name to Delta Games, and then later to Talisman Games. In 2010, Talisman Games changed ownership and transitioned Galac-Tac to a web-based game. It is still available for play by postal mail or email for those with web access challenges. The game has been updated as well as reviewed multiple times in its 40 years of active play. Various reviews in the 1980s and 1990s provided both positive and negative comments as well as potential areas for the game to improve. The game has been featured numerous times in the modern PBM magazine, Suspense & Decision.

During gameplay, players begin in one of hundreds of star systems in a 100 × 100 grid map with money and some basic ships, expanding to other star systems in search of resources. Players can establish colonies to enable further expansion. Military conflict is a significant factor in the game with great leeway in the design of fleets and the ability to design individual ships. Diplomacy, espionage, and technology research and development are also important parts of gameplay. The goal is to be the last player remaining or have the strongest position at game's end. Games last about 85 to 95 turns.

Play-by-mail history
Some games have long been played by mail between two players, such as chess and Go. PBM play of Diplomacy—a multiplayer game—began in 1963. The emergence of the professional PBM industry occurred less than a decade later. Rick Loomis, "generally recognized as the founder of the PBM industry", accomplished this by launching Flying Buffalo Inc. and his first PBM game, Nuclear Destruction, in 1970. Professional game moderation started in 1971 at Flying Buffalo. Chris Harvey started commercial PBM play afterward in the United Kingdom with a company called ICBM through an agreement with Loomis and Flying Buffalo. ICBM, followed by KJC games and Mitregames, led the UK PBM industry. For approximately five years, Flying Buffalo was the single dominant company in the US PBM industry until Schubel & Son entered the field in about 1976 with the human-moderated The Tribes of Crane. Superior Simulations was the next significant PBM company to enter the US market. They did so in 1978 with the game Empyrean Challenge which one observer stated was "the most complex game system on Earth".

The early 1980s saw additional growth for PBM. The player base grew and game moderators were plentiful. The most popular games in 1980 were Starweb and Tribes of Crane. The PBM industry in 1980 comprised two large companies and some small ones. In 1981, some PBM players launched another company, Adventures by Mail, with the "immensely popular" Beyond the Stellar Empire. It was within this environment that Phoenix Publications launched Galac-Tac.

Game development
Galac-Tac began in 1982 as a closed-end PBM game published by Phoenix Publications in Dallas, TX. The game was computer-moderated, but the gamemasters would handle "special situations". In December 1983, as the game reached sixteen universes, the company had to close gameplay for reprogramming to allow faster processing as the original computer could only handle about seven universes. By 1990, the publisher name had changed to Delta Games. In the early postal mail version of the game, turnaround times for turns was two to three weeks. In 1990, Delta Games released an updated version. In 2010, husband and wife team Davin Church and Genny White (as well as their associate Doug Neman) as the new Talisman Games game owners began transitioning Galac-Tac to the web using a subscription business model. They also created the Galac-Tac Assistant (GTAC), which is still available as of November 2021. As of November 2021, the game can also be played by postal mail or email for those with no or limited web access, such as military, those in prison, or other cases.

Gameplay
In the 21st-century version of the play-by-web game, players view the original position report and subsequent turn reports on the web where they also enter orders. Players begin the game in one of hundreds of star systems within a 100 × 100 grid map with some money—called Production Inventory (PI)—and basic ships. Players expand into other star systems in search of "raw material", or Production Value (PV) which can be sold on return. Colonies with Production Centers also enable conversion of raw materials to PI. Players can use scout ships for exploring, cargo ships for transporting PV, and warships for protecting claims and battling other players. Players are allowed 30 actions per turn. As of 1992, turns were written on an "action sheet" for the PBM version of the game. In the 21st century version of the game, entries are web-based and up to 50 actions are allowed per turn.

Combat is consequential in Galac-Tac, and "[i]n the end, your military might and strategy will determine if you win or lose". Players have great leeway in the organization and programming of fleets, but fleets act autonomously during battles using only general directions from the player. Investing in technology research and development and conducting espionage are also important parts of gameplay. Diplomacy is also available in the game and "Timely negotiations should never be ruled out." Losing a Home World essentially ends a player's game. The purpose of the game is to eliminate all other players or be the strongest player at game's end. As of 2021, games last about 85–95 turns.

Reception
Danial Dias reviewed the game in the May–June 1984 issue of Paper Mayhem magazine, stating that Galac-Tac is "a very good game," while pointing out the value for a player's money and good customer service. Chris Milliken reviewed Galac-Tac in the March–April 1990 issue of Paper Mayhem magazine. He noted downsides that the game could become monotonous, combat reports could be dull, and defensive capabilities outweighed offensive, while concluding that "I have found Delta Games to be exemplary in their service and Galac-Tac to be [a] fundamentally good game." The Delta Games Gamemaster, Jon Capps, responded to the review in the same issue, agreeing with the combat report comment, and identifying that Delta Games had released a new version of the game. Phil Krauskopf reviewed the game in the January–February 1992 issue of Paper Mayhem, noting a point of attraction was the ability for ship design. He concluded that Galac-Tac was "quite an enjoyable game" stating that he did not experience the monotony noted by the previous reviewer. He also received positive feedback from other players on the game. Krauskopf thought that providing star systems with integral defenses would be an improvement and Delta Games suggested this was in the works based on player interest. Eric Carver reviewed Galac-Tac in the August 2014 to September 2015 issue of Suspense & Decision magazine. He concluded that the game had "excellent game design and execution", was "simple to learn but complex to master", and was "easy to include and involve friends" or family among other comments.

See also
 List of play-by-mail games

Notes

References

Bibliography

Further reading

External links
 

Multiplayer games
Play-by-mail games
Strategy games
Wargames introduced in the 1980s